Rocky and the Dodos is a stop motion animated television series seen on CITV in 1998 and 1999. The show was animated by Cosgrove Hall Films and created by Isabell Mills and Shanii Novak. Rocky And The Dodos aired on then-new channel Toons & Tunes (later renamed Pop) in 2003.

Premise
The series focuses on a group of anthropomorphic dodos who live on a remote, rocky island. The action rarely moves away from it. Although the series is recognisably set in the modern day, with aeroplanes and electricity, the island is seemingly unknown to man. Various pieces of man-made detritus, such as household appliances, foodstuffs and furniture, regularly wash up on the island, and often play a central role in episode plots.

The dodos have only the vaguest notion of any life away from their island, referring to everything away from the immediate vicinity as 'the beyond', and refer to the semi-mythical beings which populate it as 'Fartians'.

Characters 
Rocky - A young male dodo who lives in a cave with Elvis. He is good-natured, impressionable and always eager for adventure, though Elvis' antics sometimes cause more trouble than he can comfortably handle.

Elvis - A bizarre bird who lives with Rocky. It is not made clear how they first met. Elvis resembles a cross between a penguin and a blue-footed booby, though has a long flexible tongue; it is never made clear exactly what species he is (indeed he seems not to know himself). He has an outrageous, excitable manner, and is inclined to cause chaos and mayhem at every opportunity. He is, however, more intelligent than most of the dodos, and enjoys playing tricks on them if he gets the chance.

Bill - The rather vain and slightly camp dodo who owns and operates the Loose Juice Bar on the island, where he creates popular (but odd) cocktails. He has a large, prominent quiff of which he is inordinately proud.

Wonda - The wife of Bill. She has orange, frizzy hair and wears a necklace of seashells. She is probably (at least in comparison with the others), the cleverest of the dodos, regularly alluding to the words and actions of the 'ancient dodos', and sometimes acts as the group's de facto leader or organiser should a situation require one.

Tantra - A young female dodo who has an appearance and mannerism modeled on punk subculture, with her hair dyed bright red and her beak painted in bright colours. She wears a bath-chain (complete with plug) on the end of her beak. She is friendly with Elvis (even replacing Rocky in their cave in one episode), but seems to spend most of her time alone.

Astra - A deeply scatterlogical and eccentric female dodo who speaks with an upper-class English accent and lives in the uppermost cave on the island (accessible by a lift seen in the title-sequence). She is obsessed with studying the various objects from 'the beyond' which wash up on the island's shores, and working towards making contact with the 'Fartians'. For all her scholarly airs, she is not very intelligent, and generally misidentifies the things she discovers, thinking for example, that a clothes horse is a skeleton, and that a rubber duck is alive.

Dougan - A lazy and less-than-bright walrus who lives at the island's rubbish-dump.

Bjorn - An affable Swedish-accented puffin who regularly visits the island. Owing to his ability to fly, he has a far better understanding of 'the beyond' than the dodos.

The Limpets - A large, unspecified number of limpets which live both around and on the island. They move much quicker than real limpets, and have prominent eyes on the tops of their shells. Although they do not speak, they have considerable intelligence. They rarely play an important role in stories, but are vital to the island's smooth (as much as this is possible) operation, as they provide power to the various appliances by running in devices which resemble large hamster wheels.

List of episodes

Series 1

Series 2

Release 
On 13 January 2003, Cinema Club and Granada Media released 2 DVDs and videos of Rocky and the Dodos, one with Episodes 1–6, and one with Episodes 7–12. So far, the final episode of Series 1 and all of Series 2 have not been released in the UK, but some episodes from Series 2 were released on video in Australia by ABC Video and in Germany by VCL.

References

External links

Toonhound
bbfc entry from 2003

1998 British television series debuts
1999 British television series endings
1990s British children's television series
British children's animated adventure television series
ITV children's television shows
English-language television shows
British stop-motion animated television series
Television series by ITV Studios
Television shows produced by Central Independent Television
1990s British animated television series
Television series by Cosgrove Hall Films
Animated television series about birds